Robert Rhodes may refer to:

 Robert Heaton Rhodes (1815–1884), New Zealand politician
 Sir Robert Heaton Rhodes (1861–1956), his son, New Zealand politician and lawyer
 Robert L. Rhodes, provost at Abilene Christian University

See also
 Robert Ben Rhoades (born 1945), serial killer